William Stickney may refer to:
 William Stickney (golfer), American golfer
 William W. Stickney (politician) (William Wallace Stickney), American lawyer and politician in Vermont
 William W. Stickney (USMC) (William Wallace Stickney), United States Marine Corps general and lawyer
 William Weir Stickney, American attorney and politician in New Hampshire
 William Stickney (board of directors member), member of the board of directors of the Columbia Institution for the Deaf